The communauté de communes du Canton de Criquetot-l’Esneval is a former intercommunality in the Seine-Maritime département of the Normandy region of northern France. It was created on 28 December 2001. and it was merged into the new communauté urbaine Le Havre Seine Métropole on 1 January 2019.

Composition
The communauté de communes consisted of the following 21 communes:

Angerville-l'Orcher
Anglesqueville-l'Esneval
Beaurepaire
Bénouville
Bordeaux-Saint-Clair
Criquetot-l'Esneval
Cuverville
Étretat
Fongueusemare
Gonneville-la-Mallet
Hermeville
Heuqueville
Pierrefiques
La Poterie-Cap-d'Antifer
Saint-Jouin-Bruneval
Saint-Martin-du-Bec
Sainte-Marie-au-Bosc
Le Tilleul
Turretot
Vergetot
Villainville

See also
Communes of the Seine-Maritime department

References

Criquetot-l'Esneval